Hugo Arana (23 July 1943 – 11 October 2020) was an Argentine film, television, and theatre actor.

Life
Arana was born on 23 July 1943. He grew up in Monte Grande where his parents were farmers and moved with his family to Lomas de Zamora and then Lanús. He studied acting with Marcello Lavalle and Augusto Fernandes.

In his first years as an actor, he was part of a theatre group called "Errare Humanum Est" and he acted in films such as El Santo de la Espada (1970) and La tregua (1974).

In the 1980s, he became popular for his part in an advertisement for Crespi wine, and then for his part in the TV sitcom Matrimonios y algo más, created by Hugo Moser, in which he played two characters who were highly acclaimed by the public: the "Groncho" (in the comedy sketch "El Groncho y La Dama" (The Shabby Man and the Lady)) and Huguito Araña (a stereotypically feminine gay man).

He worked on the Telefé TV series Los exitosos Pells, where he played the director of the fictitious channel "Mega News", Franco Andrada.

After suffering a hard fall, Arana was hospitalized and subsequently tested positive for COVID-19 during the COVID-19 pandemic in Argentina. Arana died of the disease on 11 October 2020, at the age of 77.

Filmography

Awards and nominations

References

External links
 
 CineNacional.com (Filmography).
 GaceMail.com.ar (Interview).

1943 births
2020 deaths
Male actors from Buenos Aires
Argentine male film actors
Argentine male television actors
Argentine male telenovela actors
Argentine male stage actors
20th-century Argentine male actors
21st-century Argentine male actors
Deaths from the COVID-19 pandemic in Argentina